Scott Chapman Plank (November 11, 1958 – October 24, 2002) was an American actor who played Nick Reardon on Melrose Place, and as Wiley Farrell on Air America.

Life and acting career
Scott Plank was born in Washington, D.C. on November 11, 1958.

Plank's last feature film was the movie Holes (2003) starring Sigourney Weaver and Jon Voight, in which he had the supporting role of Trout Walker. In addition he appeared in The Flying Dutchman in 2001, which co-starred Rod Steiger, Saints and Sinners in 1994, The In Crowd in 1988, Panama Sugar in 1990, which co-starred Oliver Reed, and finally Without Evidence (1995), which co-starred Angelina Jolie.

His television credits include appearances in The Division (2001), Sons and Daughters (1991), Air America (1998) and Melrose Place (1992). In 1989, Plank starred as Sgt. Vincent Hanna in the TV movie L.A. Takedown, directed by Michael Mann (Al Pacino played Hanna in Mann's 1995 theatrical remake, Heat).

Plank had an extensive theatre background that spans from Broadway to Regional theatre in Los Angeles. He was in the original cast of Dreamgirls on Broadway and toured for many years with A Chorus Line in which he played various roles. Regional theatre roles include Hurlyburly co-starring alongside Sean Penn, and a one-act play Kindness of Women, written and directed by Sean Penn.

Other works

Member of the original Broadway cast of the 1981 musical Dreamgirls portraying a member of 'The James Early Band'.
Theater Broadway, Chorus Line Shubert Theater
The Kindness of Women Writer/Director: Sean Penn
G.R. Point Director: Howard Fine/ Callboard Theater
Theater Regional LA, Hurlyburly, Writer-Director: David Rabe/ Westwoodplayhouse
Theatre, The Fool at the Met Theatre. Director: James Gammon.
Appeared in Shania Twain's "Dance with the one that brought you", Director: Sean Penn.

Death
On October 24, 2002, Plank died in Los Angeles, California, from injuries sustained from a car accident three days earlier. He was 43 years old. Holes was dedicated to his memory.

Filmography

References

External links

1958 births
2002 deaths
Male actors from Los Angeles
Male actors from Washington, D.C.
American male film actors
American male television actors
Road incident deaths in California
20th-century American male actors